Donaldas Kairys (born March 6, 1977) is a Lithuanian professional basketball coach and former player.

Coaching career
On February 4, 2020, Kairys was signed by Avtodor Saratov as head coach. He left the position after the season ended.

On June 9, 2020, Kairys was named head coach of Rytas Vilnius. On January 16, 2021 Kairys was fired after two decisive losses

National teams career
Kairys served as assistant coach for the Lithuania national basketball team from 2006 to 2012.

References

1977 births
Living people
Guards (basketball)
Lithuanian basketball coaches
BC Avtodor coaches
Lithuanian men's basketball players
Lithuanian expatriate basketball people in Russia
Lithuanian expatriate basketball people in Latvia
Lithuanian expatriate basketball people in Ukraine
Lithuanian expatriate basketball people in Estonia